Gregg Peter Olson is a United States Marine Corps lieutenant general who serves as the Director of the Marine Corps Staff since August 26, 2020. Previously, he was the Assistant Deputy Commandant for Plans, Policies and Operations of the United States Marine Corps. Olson is a 1985 graduate of the United States Naval Academy.

References

External links

Year of birth missing (living people)
Living people
Place of birth missing (living people)
United States Naval Academy alumni
Recipients of the Meritorious Service Medal (United States)
Recipients of the Legion of Merit
United States Marine Corps generals
Recipients of the Defense Superior Service Medal